The 2nd Infantry Battalion is one of the three infantry battalions, along with the b1k and b3k, part of the Albanian Land Force.  The b2k it is based in Zall-Herr, Tirana. It consists on 3 companies, with 100 – 130 soldiers each, with a total about 700, effective as a whole battalion. Normally they fall under the command of Land Force Command and Staff.

The b2k is a light motorized infantry which serves as well as rapid reaction force. Since 2014, after Wales summit, became part of the newly established "Very High Readiness Joint Task Force"' (VJTF) and NRF, as a need of NATO allied countries.

See also
 Albanian Armed Forces
 Albanian Land Force
 Albanian Naval Force
 Albanian Air Force

References

Military units and formations of Albania